Marina Ann Hantzis (born March 14, 1988), known professionally as Sasha Grey, is an American actress, model, writer, musician, and former pornographic film actress. Grey began her acting career in the pornographic film industry, winning 15 awards for her work between 2007 and 2010, including the AVN Award for Female Performer of the Year in 2008. In 2023, she was inducted into the AVN Hall of Fame.

After her 2009 feature film debut as the lead in Steven Soderbergh's The Girlfriend Experience, she starred in independent films including Open Windows, the Canadian black comedy horror film Smash Cut and the horror film Would You Rather. In 2011, she played a fictionalized version of herself in the HBO comedy-drama series Entourage.

Grey was a co-founder, singer, and writer of aTelecine, an industrial music band. She is the author of The Juliette Society trilogy of novels and also writes, directs, and co-produces films and music videos.

Early life
Grey was born in North Highlands, California, into a working-class family. Her father was a Greek-American who worked as a mechanic and died in June 2015. Her mother is of English, Irish, and Polish descent. Grey's parents divorced before she started middle school and she was subsequently raised by her mother, who remarried in 2000. She was raised as an adherent of Catholicism.

Grey attended four high schools, including Highlands High in North Highlands, and was unhappy at each. She graduated a year early at the age of 17, and in late 2005, she attended Sacramento City College and took classes in film, dance, and acting. She bussed tables at a Black Angus steakhouse until March 2006 and saved $7,000 for a move to Los Angeles.

Career

Pornographic films

In May 2006, Grey moved to Los Angeles, California, and performed in hardcore pornography. She initially considered calling herself Anna Karina, after the French New Wave actress of the same name, before choosing Sasha Grey. The name 'Sasha' was taken from Sascha Konietzko of the band KMFDM. Her surname either came from Oscar Wilde's novel The Picture of Dorian Gray or, alternatively, was inspired by how the Kinsey scale, grades homosexual and heterosexual attraction as a continuum, a "scale of grey".

Grey's first scene was with Rocco Siffredi for Fashionistas Safado: The Challenge by John Stagliano and helped Grey quickly make a name for herself in the adult film industry after she asked Siffredi to punch her in the stomach during the scene, an act she later stated was improvised. Less than six months after entering the adult industry, Grey was featured in the November 2006 edition of Los Angeles where she was flagged as a potential major star, perhaps the next Jenna Jameson. In December 2006, Grey was interviewed on the syndicated entertainment industry news program The Insider. In February 2007, Grey appeared on The Tyra Banks Show and discussed teenagers working in the sex industry. There was speculation the show was heavily edited and had not included her defense of adult film as a career choice. The show was also criticized for editing the interview to increase its dramatic value.

In 2008, she became the youngest woman ever to win the AVN Female Performer of the Year Award In 2008 Grey announced that she would represent herself in the adult industry through her agency L.A. Factory Girls. Grey also appeared in Pirates II: Stagnetti's Revenge, which won in 15 categories at the 26th AVN Awards ceremony in 2009, making it the most awarded film ever at the ceremony.

Grey filmed her last adult film at age 21 in 2009 and announced her retirement from the industry on Facebook in April 2011. 

A. O. Scott of The New York Times described Grey's pornography career as "distinguished both by the extremity of what she is willing to do and an unusual degree of intellectual seriousness about doing it". Grey was the G4tv host in a two-hour documentary on Sexpo Australia for Attack of the Show! in 2009. In 2011, CNBC named Grey as one of the 12 most popular stars in adult films and noted that her mainstream roles had kept interest in her earlier adult film work high and that several companies continued to release compilations from her films. The Guardian counted her as starring in 270 adult films. 

Grey directed the films Birthday Party and The Seduction (2009).

Modeling
Grey was named Penthouses Pet of the Month for July 2007 and was photographed by fashion photographer Terry Richardson. She was also profiled in the December 2008 Rolling Stone magazine and appeared twice in Playboy, in a December 2009 pictorial and as the cover feature in October 2010. Grey has modeled for various clients, including Max Azria's line Manoukian, American Apparel, and  Flaunt. Grey modeled for Richard Kern as a part of Vice magazine's anti-fashion layout and appeared in his book and in the three-part VBS.tv program Shot by Kern.

Grey appeared in Taschen's 25th anniversary reprint of Terry Richardson's book Terryworld and in his Wives, Wheels, Weapons, a companion book to James Frey's Bright Shiny Morning. She has modeled for artists James Jean, Zak Smith, Dave Naz, David Choe, and Frédéric Poincelet, who also created the artwork for her industrial music band aTelecine's ...And Six Dark Hours Pass album. In May 2010 she interviewed artist Terence Koh for BlackBook. In 2010, Grey was one of four actors who appeared in  Julião Sarmento's video installation Leporello and was featured in the Richardson magazine A4. Richard Phillips made a short film called Sasha Grey in the Chemosphere for the Gagosian Gallery in 2011 and also portrayed her for the Frieze Art Fair in 2013. Hypocrite Design described Sasha Grey in the film as a "perpetually evolving figure". In an interview with Allure in 2018, Grey said her look was "definitely punk-inspired, definitely the anti-aesthetic, and I've definitely grown out of that because I'm older".

Acting

The Girlfriend Experience

In director Steven Soderbergh's film The Girlfriend Experience, Grey played the lead role of Chelsea, an escort who is paid to act as her clients' girlfriend. Soderbergh cast Grey after reading her profile in Los Angeles magazine. As Grey prepared for her role in The Girlfriend Experience, Soderbergh asked her to watch Jean-Luc Godard's films Vivre sa vie and Pierrot le Fou, both of which star Anna Karina. Grey and Soderbergh also interviewed two escorts whom they took character traits and behaviors from. 

Reviews of Grey's performance in The Girlfriend Experience were mixed. Entertainment Weekly found Grey was "not so much a natural actress as a natural-born placid, affectless Barbie doll". New York said the actors "appear to be improvising (badly)". Violet Blue wrote that "Grey herself is as complex and layered and mesmerizing as a Soderbergh film itself—that's why Grey's fans cross all kinds of cultural and moral divides". On Rotten Tomatoes, the film received a rating of 66% based on 138 reviews. In 2016, Glenn Kenny who played the majordomo of an escort-review site,  described The Girlfriend Experience as a "digital film from another era" with most scenes being two-handers.

Other 
Grey appeared in a 2009 episode of James Gunn's PG Porn with James Gunn, made a cameo appearance in Dick Rude's 2010 independent film Quit, and starred in the 2009 Canadian low-budget black comedy/horror film Smash Cut with David Hess from Odessa/Zed Filmworks. Grey played a fictionalized version of herself in the seventh season of the HBO series Entourage as Vincent Chase's new girlfriend in a multi-episode arc. The season has a 57% rating (13 fresh, 10 rotten) on Rotten Tomatoes. Grey played Raven in the thriller I Melt With You, directed by Mark Pellington, which premiered at the Sundance Film Festival on January 26, 2011. She then starred in the Indonesian film Shrouded Corpse Bathing While Hip-Shaking, which premiered on April 28, 2011. She co-starred in the 2012 horror-thriller Would You Rather, which was directed by David Guy Levy, and which has a critics' consensus rating of 59% based on 22 reviews at Rotten Tomatoes. A critic noted the similarity of her role as "unflinching in the wildest of circumstances, when vying for a hefty sum of cash at the expense of [her] health" to Grey's own career as an adult actor.

She voiced the character Viola DeWynter in the 2011 video game Saints Row: The Third and reprised the role again in 2015 for Saints Row: Gat Out of Hell. In 2013, in the documentary series Durch die Nacht mit ..., Mariya Ocher took Grey to nightlife venues in Hamburg where Grey ignored the "women prohibited" barrier of the Herbertstraße. In 2014 she starred with Elijah Wood in Open Windows, which was directed by Nacho Vigalondo. Nikola Grozdanovic wrote that "all of Open Windows is constructed in a way for all of the action to unfold through some kind of computer screen". The Tomatometer critics' consensus for Open Windows was 40% based on 40 reviews. In 2017, Sasha Grey and Danny Trejo starred in the arthouse thriller Black Licorice, which was directed by Frankie Latina and in 2009 Grey was a co-producer of Latina's Modus Operandi, also starring Danny Trejo.

Grey appeared in music videos for The Smashing Pumpkins' 2007 song "Superchrist", and for The Roots' 2008 song "Birthday Girl". In 2011, she appeared in the music video for Eminem's song "Space Bound", which premiered on Vevo, playing a girlfriend whom Eminem strangles before realizing that she is only a figment of his imagination.

Music

In 2008, Grey began an industrial music collaboration called aTelecine with Pablo St. Francis  and the two later added Anthony D' Juan and Ian Cinnamon. The project's first EP, aVigillant Carpark, was released in 2009. The same year, Grey also contributed vocals to the Current 93 album Aleph at Hallucinatory Mountain.

In 2010, aTelecine released its first album, ...And Six Dark Hours Pass, and followed it up with the first of three A Cassette Tape Culture compilations. Paul Maher Jr. compared Sasha Grey with Cathy Ames in John Steinbeck's novel East of Eden, describing the ambient tracks of aTelecine as aural wrecking balls, stated that Grey's artistic temperament comes close to that of the Marquis de Sade as "a proponent of freedom tethered to its furthest extremities, yet untethered by laws, morality or religion" and admired her courage and audaciousness. In July 2013 it was announced that Grey had left the band, leaving Ian Cinnamon and a new vocalist as the only remaining full-time members.

In 2012, Grey covered Nico for the X-TG album Desertshore. In 2014, Grey and Jayceeoh produced "Heat of the Night", featuring Bella. In 2015, psytrance band Infected Mushroom featured Grey's vocals in their album Converting Vegetarians II in the track "Fields of Grey". In 2016, Grey contributed to the Death in Vegas album Transmission. The former Throbbing Gristle members Chris & Cosey remixed "Consequences of Love", a Transmission song performed and composed by Grey and Fearless. In 2017, Michael Mayer adapted the Chris & Cosey remix in his DJ-Kicks album. Vice described Transmission as an "EBM-inspired romp through the darker edges of the sleazier clubs in the nightlife spectrum". In a cameo appearance, DJ Harvey plays "Consequences of Love" in the rave party at the Grand Palais scene of Mission: Impossible – Fallout. In 2018, Death in Vegas published the single "Honey", with Grey as writer, singer, and film director of Drone Records' video for the song. In August 2018 PIG published "That's The Way (I Like It)", featuring Grey, and premiered it on the website Pornhub.

Since 2010, Grey has regularly performed as a DJ and has published some of her mixes on SoundCloud. Grey said she uses CDJs, USB-sticks, and SD cards when making her music. Earmilk editor David Sikorski considered her mixes as "testament to her wide range, eclectic taste in music, and her ability to understand the mechanics of solid electronic music production".

Books
Grey's photo book Neü Sex was released on March 29, 2011. BlackBook described it as "another right step in transforming herself into the multimedia artist she sees herself as" and the Portland Mercury compared Grey's "distinct style" with the photography of Cindy Sherman and Terry Richardson.

Her second book, an erotic novel titled The Juliette Society, was released on May 9, 2013. Karley Sciortino described the book as a "satirical, erotic novel that follows Catherine, a film student who enters a secret, elite sex society", and in an interview Grey stated she paid homage to novels like The 120 Days of Sodom, Thérèse the Philosopher, and Voltaire's Candide. Alisande Fitzsimons wrote that The Juliette Society contains references to classic erotic literature and film, and Cosmopolitan UK called it "erotica with a difference". In 2016, the second book of The Juliette Society trilogy, The Janus Chamber, was published and the third installment, The Mismade Girl, followed in 2018. Grey described The Juliette Society as somewhat autobiographical. Allen Foster wrote that The Janus Chamber is "a brilliant work of literature", much more Satyricon than Fifty Shades of Grey, where Grey's "wry sense of humor reveals itself in the obscure pop culture references".

The trilogy was translated into several languages, and in October 2019 the German translation of The Mismade Girl was published by Heyne Hardcore as X.

Other ventures
In 2020, Grey began hosting a show on VENN called Grey Area.

Grey began streaming video game playthroughs on Twitch in the first half of 2020.

Personal life
Grey identifies herself as an existentialist and as bisexual. She was in a long-term relationship and engagement with Ian Cinnamon, who is 13 years her senior, but the couple split up in 2013.

In May 2016 interview, rock and pop culture critic Art Tavana compared Grey with Madonna, describing her as "defiantly feminist" and as "novelist, EDM DJ, sex-positive feminist, Formula 1 racer or action star—no matter what it is, it's more than 'ex-porn star'". In 2009, Meghan O'Rourke wrote that Grey "sees her extremity as helping to liberate female sexuality" but she called Grey's persona "a clever marketing tactic". Vanessa Grigoriadis stated that "what's most important about her is her impact on feminism". In a 2011 interview with Journal Frankfurt, Grey commented that she dislikes the term 'feminist', saying she would be a 'post-modern feminist' if she was one.

Grey is a professed movie buff, leading to her 2006 alias Anna Karina after the French-Danish film actress, and likes the work of Italian film director Michelangelo Antonioni, French New Wave filmmaker Jean-Luc Godard, Danish Dogme 95 director Lars von Trier, New German Cinema filmmaker Werner Herzog, feminist filmmaker Catherine Breillat, and American filmmaker David Lynch. MovieLine recognized her as "Twitter's Art-House Eulogist".

Sasha Grey described herself as a David Bowie fan and contributed to a French homage after he died in 2016. Other musical influences of Grey's include KMFDM, Throbbing Gristle, Coil, and Nine Inch Nails. Grey also collects vinyl records and her motto is Lotta continua.

In 2010, in an interview with Maxim, Grey said her parents were not happy with her involvement in the adult film industry but that they were on good terms with her nonetheless; Grey's father died in 2015.

Activism
In February 2010, Sasha Grey and Joanna Angel were Sex Week at Yale panelists. Later the same year, she published her opinions on the Mark Sanford extramarital affair in an op-ed for Newsweek 20/10. In a March 2014 interview Grey spoke in defense of the adult industry and on behalf of outed Duke University student-turned-adult-actress Belle Knox.

In November 2011, Grey participated in a guest reading program at Emerson Elementary School in Compton, California. After some parents complained, Grey responded to the controversy by stating, "I committed to this program with the understanding that people would have their own opinions about what I have done, who I am, and what I represent". Grey also appeared on the American talk show The View, where she said she thought the schoolchildren's parents should have been given prior notice of the identity of guest readers and that she would not have accepted the job if parents had objected to her.

In March 2012, she published a video supporting Equal Pay Day. In July 2013, shortly after the National Security Agency's PRISM surveillance program was first publicized, Grey starred in a Funny or Die "Sexy NSA Commercial" parody. She supported Bernie Sanders during the 2016 Democratic Party presidential primaries and supports Planned Parenthood. In 2020, she supported Direct Relief for the Puerto Rico earthquakes and Black Lives Matter on her Twitch stream.

Awards

Filmography

Film

Series

Music videos

Video games

Discography
with aTelecine
2009: aVigillant Carpark (EP; Pendu Sound Recordings)
2010: A Cassette Tape Culture (Pendu Sound Recordings)
2010: ...And Six Dark Hours Pass (Dais Records)
with Current 93
2009: Aleph at Hallucinatory Mountain (Coptic Cat)
with X-TG
2012: Desertshore (covering Nico, Industrial Records)
with Infected Mushroom
2015: Fields Of Grey (EP; Dim Mak Records)
with Death in Vegas
2016: Transmission (LP, Drone Records)
2018: Honey (EP; Drone Records)
with PIG
2018: That's The Way (I Like It) (EP; Pig Industries, Armalyte Industries)
2019: You've Lost That Lovin' Feelin'  (cover duet, LP Candy, Armalyte Industries)

Bibliography
 Neü Sex (VICE Books, 2011)
 The Juliette Society (Grand Central Publishing, 2013)
 The Juliette Society, Book II: The Janus Chamber (Cleis Press, 2016)
 The Juliette Society, Book III: The Mismade Girl (Cleis Press, 2018)

See also
 Feminist views on pornography
 List of adult film actors who appeared in mainstream films
 List of premature obituaries

References

External links
 
 
 
 
 

21st-century American actresses
21st-century American musicians
21st-century American women writers
21st-century American women musicians
Actresses from California
American DJs
American experimental musicians
American women singers
American women drummers
American women guitarists
American women pianists
American film actresses
American television actresses
American video game actresses
American voice actresses
Motion capture actresses
American industrial musicians
American people of English descent
American people of Greek descent
American people of Irish descent
American people of Polish descent
American pornographic film actresses
Existentialists
Women DJs
Female models from California
Living people
Penthouse Pets
People from Sacramento County, California
Pornographic film actors from California
Postmodern feminists
Sex-positive feminists
Writers from California
American YouTubers
Twitch (service) streamers
Feminist musicians
1988 births
American LGBT musicians
American LGBT actors